2,5-Bis(4-bromophenyl)-3,4-diphenylcyclopentadienone is a variant of tetraphenylcyclopentadienone containing 2 bromine atoms at the para positions of the phenyl rings at the 2- and 5- positions of the central cyclopentadienone ring. Like tetraphenylcyclopentadienone, it is a black solid.

Preparation
2,5-Bis(4-bromophenyl)-3,4-diphenylcyclopentadienone may be prepared by the reaction of bis(4-bromobenzyl) ketone with benzil in the presence of base in a double aldol condensation.

Reactions

2,5-Bis(4-bromophenyl)-3,4-diphenylcyclopentadienone reacts with diphenylacetylene in benzophenone or diphenyl ether as solvent, in a Diels-Alder reaction, to form 1,4-bis(4-bromophenyl)-2,3,5,6-tetraphenylbenzene, a variant of hexaphenylbenzene with 2 bromine atoms on the para positions of opposite phenyl rings.

See also
Tetraphenylcyclopentadienone

References 

Enones
Phenyl compounds
Cyclopentadienes